The 1940 Philadelphia Phillies season was the 58th season in the history of the franchise. The team, managed by Doc Prothro, began their third season at Shibe Park and were picked by 73 of 76 writers in the pre-season Associated Press poll of baseball writers to finish last. The Phillies lost 103 games and finished last, 50 games behind the pennant-winning Cincinnati Reds.

Offseason 
In March 1940, the Phillies, along with the St. Louis Browns and Boston Bees were made outstanding offers of $5,000,000 by attorney Richard Cantillon for one of the teams to move its franchise to Los Angeles. Phillies owner Gerald Nugent quickly dismissed the possibility of the Phillies considering the move.

The 1940 season was the 25th anniversary of the team's 1915 National League pennant, the Phillies' lone to date. Gerry Nugent announced in April 1940 that the organization would welcome back the players from the 1915 team to celebrate the anniversary.

Regular season

Season standings

Record vs. opponents

Game log 

|- style="background:#bfb"
| 1 || April 16 || @ Giants || 3–1 || Kirby Higbe (1–0) || Carl Hubbell (0–1) || None || 14,840 || 1–0
|- style="background:#bbb"
| – || April 17 || @ Giants || colspan=6 | Postponed (threatening weather, rain, cold and wet grounds); Makeup: July 7 as a traditional double-header
|- style="background:#bbb"
| – || April 18 || @ Giants || colspan=6 | Postponed (rain, wet grounds); Makeup: August 18 as a traditional double-header
|- style="background:#bbb"
| – || April 19 || Bees || colspan=6 | Postponed (rain); Makeup: July 3 as a traditional double-header
|- style="background:#bbb"
| – || April 20 || Bees || colspan=6 | Postponed (rain); Makeup: August 6 as a traditional double-header
|- style="background:#bbb"
| – || April 21 || Bees || colspan=6 | Postponed (rain); Makeup: September 7 as a traditional double-header
|- style="background:#bbb"
| – || April 22 || Giants || colspan=6 | Postponed (cold weather, rain, wet grounds); Makeup: June 30 as a traditional double-header
|- style="background:#fbb"
| 2 || April 23 || Giants || 0–1 || Harry Gumbert (1–0) || Kirby Higbe (0–1) || None || 5,000 || 1–1
|- style="background:#fbb"
| 3 || April 24 || Giants || 2–5 || Hy Vandenberg (1–0) || Hugh Mulcahy (0–1) || None || 3,000 || 1–2
|- style="background:#fbb"
| 4 || April 25 || Dodgers || 1–3 || Hugh Casey (2–0) || Ike Pearson (0–1) || None || 1,466 || 1–3
|- style="background:#fbb"
| 5 || April 26 || Dodgers || 0–6 ||  || Lefty Smoll (0–1) || None || 1,500 || 1–4
|- style="background:#bfb"
| 6 || April 27 || @ Bees || 5–4 || Lefty Smoll (1–1) || Al Javery (0–1) || Lloyd Brown (1) || 2,345 || 2–4
|- style="background:#fbb"
| 7 || April 28 || @ Bees || 2–3 || Joe Sullivan (1–0) || Kirby Higbe (1–2) || None || 6,417 || 2–5
|- style="background:#bfb"
| 8 || April 30 || @ Pirates || 6–2 || Hugh Mulcahy (1–1) || Bob Klinger (1–2) || None || 2,015 || 3–5
|-

|- style="background:#bbb"
| – || May 1 || @ Pirates || colspan=6 | Postponed (rain); Makeup: June 9 as a traditional double-header
|- style="background:#bbb"
| – || May 2 || @ Pirates || colspan=6 | Postponed (threatening and cold weather, rain, wet grounds); Makeup: August 28 as a traditional double-header
|- style="background:#bbb"
| – || May 3 || @ Reds || colspan=6 | Postponed (rain, wet grounds, cold weather); Makeup: July 14 as a traditional double-header
|- style="background:#fbb"
| 9 || May 4 || @ Reds || 2–3  || Joe Beggs (1–0) || Kirby Higbe (1–3) || None || 4,530 || 3–6
|- style="background:#bfb"
| 10 || May 5 || @ Cubs || 7–5 || Hugh Mulcahy (2–1) || Bill Lee (2–3) || Lloyd Brown (2) || 14,676 || 4–6
|- style="background:#fbb"
| 11 || May 6 || @ Cubs || 4–5  || Larry French (4–1) || Lloyd Brown (0–1) || None || 5,293 || 4–7
|- style="background:#bfb"
| 12 || May 7 || @ Cubs || 1–0 || Ike Pearson (1–1) || Claude Passeau (1–3) || None || 2,054 || 5–7
|- style="background:#fbb"
| 13 || May 8 || @ Cardinals || 4–7 || Bill McGee (2–1) || Lefty Smoll (1–2) || Clyde Shoun (1) || 1,333 || 5–8
|- style="background:#fbb"
| 14 || May 9 || @ Cardinals || 4–8 || Ernie White (1–0) || Lloyd Brown (0–2) || None || 1,161 || 5–9
|- style="background:#bfb"
| 15 || May 11 || @ Dodgers || 5–4 || Kirby Higbe (2–3) || Luke Hamlin (2–1) || None || 10,870 || 6–9
|- style="background:#fbb"
| 16 || May 12 || @ Dodgers || 3–5 ||  || Si Johnson (0–1) || Tot Pressnell (1) || 14,505 || 6–10
|- style="background:#fbb"
| 17 || May 13 || @ Dodgers || 3–6 || Vito Tamulis (1–0) || Ike Pearson (1–2) || None || 5,337 || 6–11
|- style="background:#bfb"
| 18 || May 14 || Cardinals || 4–0 || Hugh Mulcahy (3–1) || Ernie White (1–1) || None || 1,500 || 7–11
|- style="background:#bfb"
| 19 || May 15 || Cardinals || 6–3 || Kirby Higbe (3–3) || Gene Lillard (0–1) || None || 2,000 || 8–11
|- style="background:#bbb"
| – || May 16 || Cardinals || colspan=6 | Postponed (rain); Makeup: July 25
|- style="background:#fbb"
| 20 || May 17 || Reds || 2–7  || Whitey Moore (1–0) || Lloyd Brown (0–3) || Elmer Riddle (2) || 1,731 || 8–12
|- style="background:#bfb"
| 21 || May 18 || Reds || 8–3 || Hugh Mulcahy (4–1) || Paul Derringer (3–3) || None || 8,000 || 9–12
|- style="background:#bfb"
| 22 || May 19 || Pirates || 6–5 || Si Johnson (1–1) || Rip Sewell (0–1) || None || 8,981 || 10–12
|- style="background:#bfb"
| 23 || May 20 || Pirates || 8–7 || Lefty Hoerst (1–0) || Dick Lanahan (0–2) || None || 1,000 || 11–12
|- style="background:#bbb"
| – || May 21 || Pirates || colspan=6 | Postponed (rain); Makeup: June 26 as a traditional double-header
|- style="background:#bbb"
| – || May 22 || Cubs || colspan=6 | Postponed (rain); Makeup: May 23
|- style="background:#fbb"
| 24 || May 23 || Cubs || 3–4  || Vern Olsen (2–1) || Hugh Mulcahy (4–2) || Vance Page (1) || 7,801 || 11–13
|- style="background:#bbb"
| – || May 24 || Dodgers || colspan=6 | Postponed (rain, cold, threatening weather); Makeup: September 5
|- style="background:#bbb"
| – || May 25 || Dodgers || colspan=6 | Postponed (rain); Makeup: September 6 as a traditional double-header
|- style="background:#fbb"
| 25 || May 26 || Dodgers || 1–2  || Vito Tamulis (2–0) || Kirby Higbe (3–4) || None || 3,281 || 11–14
|- style="background:#fbb"
| 26 || May 27 || @ Dodgers || 0–6 || Whit Wyatt (4–2) || Lefty Smoll (1–3) || None || 3,578 || 11–15
|- style="background:#fbb"
| 27 || May 28 || @ Dodgers || 2–4 || Freddie Fitzsimmons (4–0) || Hugh Mulcahy (4–3) || None || 28,918 || 11–16
|- style="background:#fbb"
| 28 || May 29 || @ Bees || 1–3 || Dick Errickson (2–0) || Boom-Boom Beck (0–1) || None || 1,143 || 11–17
|- style="background:#bfb"
| 29 || May 30  || @ Bees || 5–1 || Kirby Higbe (4–4) || Lou Fette (0–2) || None ||  || 12–17
|- style="background:#fbb"
| 30 || May 30  || @ Bees || 1–5  || Joe Sullivan (2–4) || Si Johnson (1–2) || None || 14,738 || 12–18
|-

|- style="background:#bfb"
| 31 || June 1 || @ Cardinals || 5–4 || Hugh Mulcahy (5–3) || Jack Russell (2–1) || Lloyd Brown (3) || 2,027 || 13–18
|- style="background:#bfb"
| 32 || June 2  || @ Cardinals || 4–2 || Boom-Boom Beck (1–1) || Max Lanier (2–2) || None ||  || 14–18
|- style="background:#fbb"
| 33 || June 2  || @ Cardinals || 2–9 || Bob Bowman (1–3) || Lefty Smoll (1–4) || None || 7,061 || 14–19
|- style="background:#fbb"
| 34 || June 4 || @ Cubs || 6–12 || Charlie Root (1–0) || Syl Johnson (0–1) || None || 3,433 || 14–20
|- style="background:#fbb"
| 35 || June 5 || @ Cubs || 2–3 || Larry French (6–4) || Hugh Mulcahy (5–4) || None || 3,304 || 14–21
|- style="background:#fbb"
| 36 || June 6 || @ Cubs || 5–11 || Bill Lee (5–7) || Ike Pearson (1–3) || Jake Mooty (1) || 3,461 || 14–22
|- style="background:#fbb"
| 37 || June 7 || @ Pirates || 4–10 || Johnny Lanning (1–1) || Si Johnson (1–3) || None || 1,174 || 14–23
|- style="background:#fbb"
| 38 || June 8 || @ Pirates || 5–6 || Ken Heintzelman (1–0) || Si Johnson (1–4) || Mace Brown (1) || 3,055 || 14–24
|- style="background:#bfb"
| 39 || June 9  || @ Pirates || 6–1 || Hugh Mulcahy (6–4) || Bob Klinger (4–5) || None ||  || 15–24
|- style="background:#fbb"
| 40 || June 9  || @ Pirates || 5–11  || Mace Brown (4–4) || Ike Pearson (1–4) || None || 14,450 || 15–25
|- style="background:#bfb"
| 41 || June 11 || @ Reds || 4–1 || Boom-Boom Beck (2–1) || Bucky Walters (9–2) || None || 3,623 || 16–25
|- style="background:#fbb"
| 42 || June 12 || @ Reds || 1–2 || Paul Derringer (8–4) || Kirby Higbe (4–5) || None || 17,289 || 16–26
|- style="background:#fbb"
| 43 || June 14 || Cardinals || 2–6 || Bob Bowman (2–3) || Hugh Mulcahy (6–5) || None || 3,000 || 16–27
|- style="background:#fbb"
| 44 || June 15 || Cardinals || 1–14 || Mort Cooper (1–3) || Boom-Boom Beck (2–2) || None || 1,000 || 16–28
|- style="background:#fbb"
| 45 || June 16  || Cardinals || 3–9 || Jack Russell (3–2) || Kirby Higbe (4–6) || None ||  || 16–29
|- style="background:#fbb"
| 46 || June 16  || Cardinals || 1–3 || Lon Warneke (4–6) || Cy Blanton (0–1) || None || 9,847 || 16–30
|- style="background:#fbb"
| 47 || June 17 || Reds || 2–6 || Whitey Moore (2–1) || Boom-Boom Beck (2–3) || None || 1,000 || 16–31
|- style="background:#bfb"
| 48 || June 18 || Reds || 3–1 || Hugh Mulcahy (7–5) || Bucky Walters (9–4) || None || 10,381 || 17–31
|- style="background:#bfb"
| 49 || June 20 || Reds || 4–3  || Kirby Higbe (5–6) || Joe Beggs (3–2) || None || 7,421 || 18–31
|- style="background:#bfb"
| 50 || June 21 || Cubs || 6–5 || Lloyd Brown (1–3) || Bill Lee (5–9) || Ike Pearson (1) || 1,000 || 19–31
|- style="background:#fbb"
| 51 || June 22 || Cubs || 2–10 || Claude Passeau (6–7) || Ike Pearson (1–5) || None || 2,500 || 19–32
|- style="background:#fbb"
| 52 || June 23  || Cubs || 2–3 || Jake Mooty (4–0) || Hugh Mulcahy (7–6) || None ||  || 19–33
|- style="background:#fbb"
| 53 || June 23  || Cubs || 2–7 || Ken Raffensberger (3–1) || Boom-Boom Beck (2–4) || None || 12,201 || 19–34
|- style="background:#bbb"
| – || June 24 || Pirates || colspan=6 | Postponed (rain); Makeup: August 3
|- style="background:#fbb"
| 54 || June 25 || Pirates || 7–9 || Johnny Lanning (2–2) || Kirby Higbe (5–7) || Bob Klinger (1) || 1,000 || 19–35
|- style="background:#bfb"
| 55 || June 26  || Pirates || 4–2 || Cy Blanton (1–1) || Joe Bowman (4–5) || None ||  || 20–35
|- style="background:#fbb"
| 56 || June 26  || Pirates || 6–11 || Rip Sewell (4–1) || Boom-Boom Beck (2–5) || Mace Brown (4) || 12,565 || 20–36
|- style="background:#fbb"
| 57 || June 27 || Giants || 0–7 || Hal Schumacher (5–6) || Hugh Mulcahy (7–7) || None || 10,985 || 20–37
|- style="background:#fbb"
| 58 || June 29 || Giants || 0–5 || Bill Lohrman (7–3) || Kirby Higbe (5–8) || None || 2,000 || 20–38
|- style="background:#bfb"
| 59 || June 30  || Giants || 7–4 || Cy Blanton (2–1) || Paul Dean (2–2) || None ||  || 21–38
|- style="background:#fbb"
| 60 || June 30  || Giants || 3–7 || Jumbo Brown (1–2) || Lefty Smoll (1–5) || Red Lynn (1) || 10,816 || 21–39
|-

|- style="background:#fbb"
| 61 || July 1 || Dodgers || 3–4 || Tot Pressnell (4–2) || Hugh Mulcahy (7–8) || Curt Davis (2) || 1,516 || 21–40
|- style="background:#fbb"
| 62 || July 2 || Dodgers || 1–4 || Tex Carleton (4–1) || Ike Pearson (1–6) || None || 1,067 || 21–41
|- style="background:#fbb"
| 63 || July 3  || Bees || 3–8 || Joe Sullivan (5–7) || Kirby Higbe (5–9) || None || 7,000 || 21–42
|- style="background:#bbb"
| – || July 3  || Bees || colspan=6 | Postponed (rain); Makeup: August 8
|- style="background:#bfb"
| 64 || July 4  || Bees || 4–3 || Cy Blanton (3–1) || Manny Salvo (2–1) || None ||  || 22–42
|- style="background:#fbb"
| 65 || July 4  || Bees || 4–5 || Dick Coffman (1–2) || Lefty Smoll (1–6) || Bill Posedel (1) || 5,082 || 22–43
|- style="background:#fbb"
| 66 || July 5 || @ Giants || 2–15 || Cliff Melton (8–2) || Hugh Mulcahy (7–9) || None || 4,702 || 22–44
|- style="background:#bfb"
| 67 || July 6 || @ Giants || 8–2 || Kirby Higbe (6–9) || Paul Dean (2–3) || None || 5,645 || 23–44
|- style="background:#fbb"
| 68 || July 7  || @ Giants || 4–6 || Hal Schumacher (6–7) || Hugh Mulcahy (7–10) || Bill Lohrman (1) ||  || 23–45
|- style="background:#bfb"
| 69 || July 7  || @ Giants || 4–2 || Si Johnson (2–4) || Roy Joiner (2–1) || None || 16,390 || 24–45
|- style="background:#bbcaff;"
| – || July 9 ||colspan="7" | 1940 Major League Baseball All-Star Game at Sportsman's Park in St. Louis
|- style="background:#bbb"
| – || July 11 || @ Pirates || colspan=6 | Postponed (rain); Makeup: August 30
|- style="background:#bfb"
| 70 || July 12 || @ Pirates || 6–3 || Hugh Mulcahy (8–10) || Joe Bowman (4–7) || None || 9,042 || 25–45
|- style="background:#fbb"
| 71 || July 13 || @ Pirates || 8–9 || Danny MacFayden (2–2) || Si Johnson (2–5) || Joe Bowman (1) || 2,375 || 25–46
|- style="background:#fbb"
| 72 || July 14  || @ Reds || 2–3 || Jim Turner (6–3) || Kirby Higbe (6–10) || None ||  || 25–47
|- style="background:#fbb"
| 73 || July 14  || @ Reds || 1–7 || Whitey Moore (3–2) || Boom-Boom Beck (2–6) || None || 17,251 || 25–48
|- style="background:#fbb"
| 74 || July 15 || @ Reds || 2–3 || Bucky Walters (13–4) || Ike Pearson (1–7) || None || 3,015 || 25–49
|- style="background:#bbb"
| – || July 16 || @ Reds || colspan=6 | Postponed (rain); Makeup: July 28 as a traditional double-header in Philadelphia
|- style="background:#bfb"
| 75 || July 17 || @ Cardinals || 3–0 || Hugh Mulcahy (9–10) || Mort Cooper (5–6) || None || 7,113 || 26–49
|- style="background:#fbb"
| 76 || July 19  || @ Cardinals || 2–3 || Bill McGee (8–5) || Kirby Higbe (6–11) || None || 1,680 || 26–50
|- style="background:#fbb"
| 77 || July 19  || @ Cardinals || 3–5 || Bob Bowman (3–3) || Cy Blanton (3–2) || None || 1,630 || 26–51
|- style="background:#bfb"
| 78 || July 20 || @ Cubs || 9–3 || Ike Pearson (2–7) || Larry French (9–8) || None || 5,382 || 27–51
|- style="background:#bfb"
| 79 || July 21  || @ Cubs || 8–2 || Hugh Mulcahy (10–10) || Vern Olsen (6–6) || None ||  || 28–51
|- style="background:#fbb"
| 80 || July 21  || @ Cubs || 5–8 || Jake Mooty (6–3) || Si Johnson (2–6) || None || 15,737 || 28–52
|- style="background:#fbb"
| 81 || July 23 || Cardinals || 3–7 || Bill McGee (9–5) || Cy Blanton (3–3) || Ira Hutchinson (1) || 4,000 || 28–53
|- style="background:#bbb"
| – || July 24 || Cardinals || colspan=6 | Postponed (rain); Makeup: September 16 as a traditional double-header
|- style="background:#bbb"
| – || July 25 || Cardinals || colspan=6 | Postponed (rain); Makeup: September 15 as a traditional double-header
|- style="background:#fbb"
| 82 || July 26 || Reds || 5–9 || Paul Derringer (14–7) || Kirby Higbe (6–12) || Joe Beggs (2) || 6,211 || 28–54
|- style="background:#bfb"
| 83 || July 27 || Reds || 5–3 || Hugh Mulcahy (11–10) || Whitey Moore (4–3) || None || 3,500 || 29–54
|- style="background:#fbb"
| 84 || July 28  || Reds || 2–7 || Jim Turner (8–3) || Boom-Boom Beck (2–7) || None ||  || 29–55
|- style="background:#bfb"
| 85 || July 28  || Reds || 4–1 || Cy Blanton (4–3) || Bucky Walters (15–5) || None || 10,160 || 30–55
|- style="background:#fbb"
| 86 || July 29 || Cubs || 3–7 || Claude Passeau (12–9) || Ike Pearson (2–8) || None || 1,000 || 30–56
|- style="background:#bfb"
| 87 || July 30 || Cubs || 7–5 || Kirby Higbe (7–12) || Bill Lee (7–13) || Si Johnson (1) || 1,000 || 31–56
|- style="background:#bfb"
| 88 || July 31 || Cubs || 7–3 || Hugh Mulcahy (12–10) || Jake Mooty (6–5) || None || 7,500 || 32–56
|-

|- style="background:#fbb"
| 89 || August 2 || Pirates || 2–5  || Joe Bowman (6–7) || Si Johnson (2–7) || Bob Klinger (2) || 7,521 || 32–57
|- style="background:#fbb"
| 90 || August 3 || Pirates || 0–8 || Mace Brown (8–7) || Kirby Higbe (7–13) || None || 1,000 || 32–58
|- style="background:#fbb"
| 91 || August 4  || Pirates || 1–6 || Rip Sewell (9–2) || Hugh Mulcahy (12–11) || None ||  || 32–59
|- style="background:#fbb"
| 92 || August 4  || Pirates || 4–6 || Johnny Lanning (4–2) || Charlie Frye (0–1) || Ken Heintzelman (2) || 7,182 || 32–60
|- style="background:#fbb"
| 93 || August 6  || Bees || 0–3 || Manny Salvo (6–5) || Si Johnson (2–8) || None || 5,288 || 32–61
|- style="background:#fbb"
| 94 || August 6  || Bees || 2–12 || Joe Sullivan (8–12) || Kirby Higbe (7–14) || None || 5,280 || 32–62
|- style="background:#fbb"
| 95 || August 7 || Bees || 3–6 || Bill Posedel (7–14) || Ike Pearson (2–9) || None || 4,929 || 32–63
|- style="background:#fbb"
| 96 || August 8 || Bees || 2–6 || Jim Tobin (1–0) || Hugh Mulcahy (12–12) || None || 1,000 || 32–64
|- style="background:#fbb"
| 97 || August 10 || Giants || 0–1 || Harry Gumbert (9–9) || Si Johnson (2–9) || None || 1,500 || 32–65
|- style="background:#bfb"
| 98 ||  || Giants || 2–0 || Kirby Higbe (8–14) || Cliff Melton (8–4) || None ||  || 33–65
|- style="background:#fbb"
| 99 || August 11  || Giants || 2–8 || Hal Schumacher (9–9) || Hugh Mulcahy (12–13) || None || 6,666 || 33–66
|- style="background:#bbb"
| – || August 13 || @ Dodgers || colspan=6 | Postponed (rain); Makeup: August 14 as a traditional double-header
|- style="background:#fbb"
| 100 || August 14  || @ Dodgers || 5–6 ||  || Si Johnson (2–10) || Tex Carleton (2) ||  || 33–67
|- style="background:#bfb"
| 101 || August 14  || @ Dodgers || 9–6 || Boom-Boom Beck (3–7) || Tex Carleton (4–6) || Kirby Higbe (1) || 24,356 || 34–67
|- style="background:#bfb"
| 102 || August 15 || @ Dodgers || 4–2 || Kirby Higbe (9–14) || Whit Wyatt (12–10) || None || 4,840 || 35–67
|- style="background:#fbb"
| 103 || August 16 || @ Giants || 3–5 || Hal Schumacher (10–9) || Hugh Mulcahy (12–14) || None || 7,362 || 35–68
|- style="background:#bbb"
| – || August 17 || @ Giants || colspan=6 | Postponed (rain); Makeup: September 26 as a traditional double-header
|- style="background:#bfb"
| 104 || August 18  || @ Giants || 6–3 || Kirby Higbe (10–14) || Cliff Melton (8–6) || Syl Johnson (1) ||  || 36–68
|- style="background:#bfb"
| 105 || August 18  || @ Giants || 8–6 || Si Johnson (3–10) || Harry Gumbert (9–11) || None || 9,502 || 37–68
|- style="background:#fbb"
| 106 || August 20 || @ Cubs || 0–4 || Claude Passeau (15–11) || Hugh Mulcahy (12–15) || None || 4,508 || 37–69
|- style="background:#bfb"
| 107 || August 21 || @ Cubs || 7–5  || Lefty Smoll (2–6) || Ken Raffensberger (5–6) || Syl Johnson (2) || 4,200 || 38–69
|- style="background:#fbb"
| 108 || August 22 || @ Cardinals || 0–9 || Mort Cooper (9–8) || Charlie Frye (0–2) || None || 2,136 || 38–70
|- style="background:#fbb"
| 109 || August 23 || @ Cardinals || 2–5 || Bob Bowman (5–4) || Kirby Higbe (10–15) || None || 1,095 || 38–71
|- style="background:#fbb"
| 110 || August 24 || @ Cardinals || 0–1 || Lon Warneke (13–7) || Si Johnson (3–11) || None || 2,423 || 38–72
|- style="background:#fbb"
| 111 || August 25  || @ Reds || 2–3 || Jim Turner (10–6) ||  || None ||  || 38–73
|- style="background:#fbb"
| 112 || August 25  || @ Reds || 5–6 || Johnny Hutchings (2–1) || Hugh Mulcahy (12–16) || None || 23,544 || 38–74
|- style="background:#fbb"
| 113 || August 26  || @ Reds || 2–3 || Bucky Walters (18–9) || Lefty Smoll (2–7) || None ||  || 38–75
|- style="background:#bfb"
| 114 || August 26  || @ Reds || 6–1 || Syl Johnson (1–1) || Whitey Moore (6–7) || None || 7,024 || 39–75
|- style="background:#bbb"
| – || August 27 || @ Reds || colspan=6 | Postponed (rain); Makeup: August 26 as a traditional double-header
|- style="background:#fbb"
| 115 || August 28  || @ Pirates || 0–5 || Rip Sewell (12–3) || Hugh Mulcahy (12–17) || None ||  || 39–76
|- style="background:#fbb"
| 116 || August 28  || @ Pirates || 2–5 || Joe Bowman (7–8) || Kirby Higbe (10–16) || None || 4,100 || 39–77
|- style="background:#fbb"
| 117 || August 29 || @ Pirates || 0–4 || Mace Brown (9–8) || Ike Pearson (2–10) || Danny MacFayden (2) || 2,239 || 39–78
|- style="background:#bbb"
| – || August 30 || @ Pirates || colspan=6 | Postponed (rain); Makeup: September 10 as a traditional double-header in Philadelphia
|- style="background:#fbb"
| 118 || August 31 || @ Bees || 4–9 || Joe Sullivan (10–13) || Charlie Frye (0–3) || None || 3,024 || 39–79
|-

|- style="background:#fbb"
| 119 || September 1  || @ Bees || 1–2 || Jim Tobin (4–2) || Hugh Mulcahy (12–18) || None ||  || 39–80
|- style="background:#fbb"
| 120 || September 1  || @ Bees || 0–10 || Manny Salvo (9–6) || Ike Pearson (2–11) || None || 10,986 || 39–81
|- style="background:#bfb"
| 121 || September 2  || Giants || 11–2 || Kirby Higbe (11–16) || Harry Gumbert (9–12) || None ||  || 40–81
|- style="background:#bfb"
| 122 || September 2  || Giants || 6–5  || Boom-Boom Beck (4–8) || Roy Joiner (3–2) || None || 13,325 || 41–81
|- style="background:#fbb"
| 123 || September 4 || Dodgers || 0–3 || Luke Hamlin (9–7) || Charlie Frye (0–4) || None || 18,031 || 41–82
|- style="background:#fbb"
| 124 || September 5 || Dodgers || 5–8  || Vito Tamulis (8–4) || Hugh Mulcahy (12–19) || None || 500 || 41–83
|- style="background:#fbb"
| 125 || September 6  || Dodgers || 0–3 || Freddie Fitzsimmons (14–2) || Kirby Higbe (11–17) || None ||  || 41–84
|- style="background:#fbb"
| 126 || September 6  || Dodgers || 3–14 || Hugh Casey (8–7) || Lefty Smoll (2–8) || None || 8,358 || 41–85
|- style="background:#fbb"
| 127 || September 7  || Bees || 2–3  || Bill Posedel (11–16) || Syl Johnson (1–2) || None ||  || 41–86
|- style="background:#fbb"
| 128 || September 7  || Bees || 1–3 || Al Javery (2–4) || Ike Pearson (2–12) || None || 1,500 || 41–87
|- style="background:#bfb"
| 129 || September 8  || Bees || 2–1  || Kirby Higbe (12–17) || Dick Errickson (11–11) || None ||  || 42–87
|- style="background:#bfb"
| 130 || September 8  || Bees || 3–1 || Si Johnson (4–11) || Jim Tobin (4–3) || None || 5,000 || 43–87
|- style="background:#fbb"
| 131 || September 10  || Pirates || 3–11 || Joe Bowman (8–9) || Hugh Mulcahy (12–20) || None ||  || 43–88
|- style="background:#fbb"
| 132 || September 10  || Pirates || 1–11 || Rip Sewell (14–3) || Charlie Frye (0–5) || None || 1,000 || 43–89
|- style="background:#fbb"
| 133 || September 11 || Pirates || 3–9 || Mace Brown (10–8) || Ike Pearson (2–13) || None || 2,500 || 43–90
|- style="background:#fbb"
| 134 || September 12 || Cubs || 1–5 || Larry French (13–13) || Si Johnson (4–12) || None || 1,000 || 43–91
|- style="background:#bfb"
| 135 || September 13 || Cubs || 6–1 || Kirby Higbe (13–17) || Charlie Root (2–4) || None || 500 || 44–91
|- style="background:#bfb"
| 136 || September 14 || Cubs || 5–3 || Syl Johnson (2–2) || Bill Lee (8–16) || None || 1,500 || 45–91
|- style="background:#fbb"
| 137 || September 15  || Cardinals || 0–7 || Bill McGee (15–9) || Ike Pearson (2–14) || None ||  || 45–92
|- style="background:#fbb"
| 138 || September 15  || Cardinals || 1–3 || Bob Bowman (7–5) ||  || None || 7,929 || 45–93
|- style="background:#bfb"
| 139 || September 16  || Cardinals || 3–2 || Si Johnson (5–12) || Mort Cooper (9–12) || None ||  || 46–93
|- style="background:#fbb"
| 140 || September 16  || Cardinals || 1–7 || Ira Hutchinson (2–2) || Charlie Frye (0–6) || None || 1,000 || 46–94
|- style="background:#fbb"
| 141 || September 17 || Reds || 1–2 || Whitey Moore (8–7) || Kirby Higbe (13–18) || None || 1,197 || 46–95
|- style="background:#fbb"
| 142 || September 18 || Reds || 3–4  ||  || Hugh Mulcahy (12–21) || Joe Beggs (7) || 2,093 || 46–96
|- style="background:#fbb"
| 143 || September 19 || Reds || 1–4 || Paul Derringer (20–12) || Johnny Podgajny (0–2) || None || 1,094 || 46–97
|- style="background:#bfb"
| 144 || September 21 || @ Dodgers || 4–2 || Kirby Higbe (14–18) || Luke Hamlin (9–8) || None || 5,727 || 47–97
|- style="background:#fbb"
| 145 ||  || @ Dodgers || 2–10 || Freddie Fitzsimmons (16–2) || Si Johnson (5–13) || None ||  || 47–98
|- style="background:#fbb"
| 146 || September 22  || @ Dodgers || 2–5  || Curt Davis (8–11) || Boom-Boom Beck (4–9) || None || 18,672 || 47–99
|- style="background:#bfb"
| 147 || September 23  || @ Bees || 6–2 || Johnny Podgajny (1–2) || Manny Salvo (10–9) || None ||  || 48–99
|- style="background:#fbb"
| 148 || September 23  || @ Bees || 0–8 || Tom Earley (2–0) || Hugh Mulcahy (12–22) || None || 1,650 || 48–100
|- style="background:#bbb"
| – || September 25 || @ Bees || colspan=6 | Canceled (rain); No makeup scheduled
|- style="background:#fbb"
| 149 || September 26  || @ Giants || 1–3 || Harry Gumbert (12–14) || Kirby Higbe (14–19) || None ||  || 48–101
|- style="background:#fbb"
| 150 || September 26  || @ Giants || 1–2 || Bob Carpenter (2–0) || Si Johnson (5–14) || None || 1,239 || 48–102
|- style="background:#bfb"
| 151 || September 27 || @ Giants || 6–0 || Hugh Mulcahy (13–22) || Carl Hubbell (11–12) || None || 1,128 || 49–102
|- style="background:#bfb"
| 152 || September 28 || Dodgers || 5–1 || Ike Pearson (3–14) || Ed Head (1–2) || None || 1,500 || 50–102
|- style="background:#fbb"
| 153 || September 29 || Dodgers || 0–5 || Lee Grissom (2–5) || Johnny Podgajny (1–3) || None || 2,000 || 50–103
|-

| style="text-align:left;" |
The original schedule indicated single games on June 2 and 3 and July 18 and 19 at St. Louis which became double-headers on June 2 and July 19.
The second game of a scheduled double-header on June 9, 1940, ended after eight innings due to the Pennsylvania Sunday curfew law with the score 5–11.
The St. Louis Cardinals turned a double-play in the second game on July 19, 1940. Contemporary newspaper accounts, as well as Retrosheet, indicate that the Phillies protested the game, but Baseball-Reference.com does not indicate that an official protest had occurred.
The original schedule indicated single games on August 9 and 11 with New York which became a double-header on August 11.
The original schedule indicated single games on September 20 and 22 at Brooklyn which became a double-header on September 22.
The original schedule indicated single games on September 23 and 24 at Boston which became a double-header on September 23.

Roster

Player stats

Batting

Starters by position 
Note: Pos = Position; G = Games played; AB = At bats; H = Hits; Avg. = Batting average; HR = Home runs; RBI = Runs batted in

Other batters 
Note: G = Games played; AB = At bats; H = Hits; Avg. = Batting average; HR = Home runs; RBI = Runs batted in

Pitching

Starting pitchers 
Note: G = Games pitched; IP = Innings pitched; W = Wins; L = Losses; ERA = Earned run average; SO = Strikeouts

Other pitchers 
Note: G = Games pitched; IP = Innings pitched; W = Wins; L = Losses; ERA = Earned run average; SO = Strikeouts

Relief pitchers 
Note: G = Games pitched; W = Wins; L = Losses; SV = Saves; ERA = Earned run average; SO = Strikeouts

Farm system 

LEAGUE CHAMPIONS: Martinsville

Ottawa franchise played first half of its schedule in Ogdensburg, New York

Notes

References 
1940 Philadelphia Phillies season at Baseball Reference

Philadelphia Phillies seasons
Philadelphia Phillies season
Philadelphia Phillies